Corliss Mondari Williamson (born December 4, 1973) is an American basketball coach and former basketball player who played for four teams during his 12-year NBA career. He last served as an assistant coach for the Phoenix Suns. His nickname is "Big Nasty", a moniker he received from his AAU coach when he was 13. Williamson was a dominating power forward in college at Arkansas, but an undersized power forward in the NBA and mostly played at the small forward position.

Amateur career

High school
Corliss Williamson played basketball at Russellville High School, where he achieved numerous accolades.  He was a three-time all-conference and all-state selection, and was named the Gatorade National Player of the Year in 1991 and 1992. Prior to his senior year, Williamson held his own against future teammate Chris Webber in an AAU championship game, getting 37 points to Webber's 38 points.  As a senior Williamson averaged twenty-eight points and nine rebounds per game, and led his team to the King Cotton Classic championship. In the title game, Russellville defeated a team led by Jason Kidd, with Williamson blocking a potential game-winner by Kidd at the buzzer.  Williamson was named tournament MVP, but gave his medal to his teammate, Marcus Thompson, at the award podium.  Williamson closed out his high school career with a selection to play in the 1992 McDonald's All-American Game.  He came in second in scoring to game MVP Othella Harrington, with fourteen points, and also had ten rebounds. His #34 jersey has been retired by Russellville High and hangs on the wall of the school's arena, along with his McDonald's All-American jersey.

College
Williamson played at the University of Arkansas from 1992 to 1995. In the 1992–93 season, Williamson led Arkansas to a 22–9 record and a Sweet 16 appearance in the NCAA Tournament, losing to the eventual national champion, the North Carolina Tar Heels.  Williamson averaged 14.6 points and 5.1 rebounds per game, and was named to the SEC All-Freshman Team.

In the 1993-94 season, Williamson was named Most Outstanding Player of the NCAA Tournament while leading the Razorbacks to a 31–3 record and their only championship under coach Nolan Richardson by defeating the Duke Blue Devils, 76–72, in the title game. Williamson led the team into the championship game in 1995 as well, but Arkansas lost to UCLA, finishing 32–7.

In three seasons at Arkansas, Williamson was named to the SEC All-Freshman Team in 1993, and was 1st Team All-SEC in 1993, 1994, and 1995. He was also named the SEC Player of the Year for the 1993–94 and 1994–95 seasons, and was named 2nd Team All-American for both years as well. In addition to the 1994 NCAA National Championship, Williamson also led the Razorbacks to the SEC West Division title all three seasons, and the SEC regular season championship in 1994. Williamson finished his career at Arkansas with 1,728 points, which ranks 8th all-time in school history. Williamson was inducted into the Arkansas Sports Hall of Fame in 2009. His jersey (#34) is one of only two that have ever been retired by the University of Arkansas, along with Sidney Moncrief (#32). He is considered one of the five greatest players in school history.

NBA career

Williamson declared for the NBA draft following his junior season, and was selected by the Sacramento Kings as a lottery pick (13th overall) in the first round of the 1995 NBA draft.
His best career year was in the 1997–98 season when he played 79 games and averaged 17.7 points per game for the Kings, finishing second to Alan Henderson for the NBA Most Improved Player Award.  After Sacramento traded him prior to the 2000–01 season to the Toronto Raptors (in exchange for Doug Christie), for whom he played 42 games, Williamson was traded to the Detroit Pistons, along with Kornel David, Tyrone Corbin, and a 2005 first-round draft choice in a package for Jerome Williams and Eric Montross. In the 2001–02 season he was named the NBA's Sixth Man of the Year and eventually was a member of the Pistons' 2003–04 NBA Championship team.  Although coming off the bench, Williamson served a pivotal role in the Detroit offense.  His coaches often looked to him in the low post when the Pistons needed a basket, where his unique skill set made him a difficult matchup as he was too powerful for small forwards to guard and too quick for power forwards.  After being traded by the Pistons along with an undisclosed amount of cash to the Philadelphia 76ers for Derrick Coleman and Amal McCaskill on August 8, 2004, he was again traded back to the Kings along with Brian Skinner and Kenny Thomas for power forward Chris Webber on February 22, 2005.

Williamson has the distinction of being one of the few professional basketball players to win championships at three different levels, AAU, the NCAA with Arkansas, and the NBA with Detroit.

Coaching career
Williamson announced his retirement in September 2007 to become an assistant coach at Arkansas Baptist College. He worked as a volunteer coach during his three years at Arkansas Baptist, succeeding Charles Ripley as the head coach for his final season at the school.

On March 12, 2010, Williamson was announced as the men's head basketball coach at the University of Central Arkansas in Conway, Arkansas. Promising to play an exciting style of play similar to his former head coach Nolan Richardson, Williamson's teams improved gradually each season, but still never won more than half of their games.

On August 2, 2013, Williamson left Central Arkansas to become an assistant for the Sacramento Kings.

On June 29, 2016, it was announced that Williamson had left the Kings to take an assistant coaching position with the Orlando Magic under new head coach Frank Vogel. Vogel previously was an assistant coach to Williamson back when he played under the 76ers. However, after Frank Vogel was fired in 2018, Williamson would be fired as well.

On May 22, 2018, it was announced that Williamson would be hired by the Phoenix Suns as an assistant coach under new head coach Igor Kokoškov. Williamson was previously connected to Igor by playing under him back when Kokoškov was an assistant coach for the Detroit Pistons during the 2003–04 championship season. However, when Kokoškov was fired after his only season as head coach for the Suns, Williamson would also be fired alongside the rest of the team's coaching staff that season.

As of October 22, 2022, Williamson was coaching High School basketball at Little Rock Christian.

References

1973 births
Living people
African-American basketball coaches
African-American basketball players
All-American college men's basketball players
American expatriate basketball people in Canada
American men's basketball coaches
American men's basketball players
Arkansas Razorbacks men's basketball players
Basketball coaches from Arkansas
Basketball players from Arkansas
Central Arkansas Bears basketball coaches
Detroit Pistons players
McDonald's High School All-Americans
Orlando Magic assistant coaches
Parade High School All-Americans (boys' basketball)
People from Russellville, Arkansas
Philadelphia 76ers players
Phoenix Suns assistant coaches
Power forwards (basketball)
Sacramento Kings assistant coaches
Sacramento Kings draft picks
Sacramento Kings players
Small forwards
Toronto Raptors players
21st-century African-American sportspeople
20th-century African-American sportspeople